Globoko is a settlement on the left bank of the Savinja River, opposite Rimske Toplice in the Municipality of Laško in eastern Slovenia. The railway line from Zidani Most to Celje runs through the settlement. The area is part of the traditional region of Styria. It is now included with the rest of the municipality in the Savinja Statistical Region.

Notable people
Notable people that were born or lived in Globoko include:
Anton Aškerc (1856–1912), poet
 (1906–2000), gymnast, sports teacher

References

External links
Globoko on Geopedia

Populated places in the Municipality of Laško